Stuart Campbell (born 1981), producing work under the name Sutu, is Australian artist and director who works with digital media. He has produced interactive webcomics, augmented reality stories, virtual reality films and virtual concerts. He lives and works in Los Angeles.

Career 
Campbell often locates his projects and presentations among isolated populations and involves the residents creating interactive web content including Neomad, a digital interactive comic series created for the iPad in collaboration with the community of Roebourne in northern western Australia. Neomad was adapted as a live-action television series in Australia and has inspired the Neo-learning curriculum in Australia.

Awards 
 2016 Gold Ledger Award- NEOMAD, print edition.
 2016 Webby Honoree for best NetArt - These Memories Won't Last
 2015 Winner of Air15 Artist in Residency in Vienna, Austria 
 2015 Winner 2016 Neo Future Ateles Artist in Residency, Finland 
 2014 Atom Awards Best Documentary – Short Form ‘How do we get to space? The story of the Love Punks & the Satellite Sisters’ (Big hArt – directed by Chynna Campbell) 
 2014 Best of 2014 award, Village Voice – The Gatecrashers graphic novel 
 2014 Best of 2014 award, Bleeding Cool – The Gatecrashers graphic novel
 2013 Japan Media Arts Festival – Jury Selection – Ngurrara 
 2013 ATOM Award – Best Game/Multimedia Production – NEOMAD 
 2012 Webby Honoree – Experimental and Innovation (Handheld Devices)
 2010 SXSW Interactive Design Award – Finalist for Nawlz 
 2009 Australian ATOM Awards Finalist Best Multimedia for Nawlz
 2008 Australian Desktop Create Awards Silver Prize for Best Digital Media 
 2007 AIMIA Best Cultural Interactive Development Award for NMA Harvest Scroll 3
 2006 Basefield Design Competition, Winner Best New Artist Category 
 2004 Melbourne Art Director Awards, Bronze Medal for Best Multimedia Animation
 2004 Melbourne Art Director Awards, Bronze Medal for Best CD Rom/DVD

Works 
 Nawlz- 24 episodes
 Modern Polaxis
 Neomad
 These Memories Won't Last
 The Ocean is Broken
 The Gatecrashers- 9 current issues
 Krysalis
 Exponius Museum
 SUTUWERLD

References 

Australian artists
Living people
1981 births